Pilot Peak, elevation , is a prominent mountain peak in the Absaroka Range in Park County, Wyoming.  The peak is visible from US Route 212, the Beartooth Highway just east of the Northeast Entrance Station to Yellowstone National Park.  Index Peak rises just north of Pilot Peak.

Pilot Peak is composed of crumbly rock and rarely climbed. Its first documented ascent was in 1932 by Robert McKenzie and Hollis Mees.

Pilot Peak's name first appeared on an 1873 map, and was officially adopted in 1937 by the United States Board on Geographic Names.

Climate 
According to the Köppen climate classification system, Pilot Peak is located in a subarctic climate zone with long, cold, snowy winters, and cool to warm summers. Temperatures can drop below −10 °F with wind chill factors below −30 °F. Precipitation runoff from the mountain drains into tributaries of the Clarks Fork Yellowstone River.

See also
 List of mountain peaks of Wyoming

Notes

External links
 Video of the first ascent: YouTube
 Weather forecast: Pilot Peak
 Pilot Peak rock climbing: Mountainproject.com

Mountains of Wyoming